Events from the year 1845 in the United States.

Incumbents

Federal Government 
 President: John Tyler (I-Virginia) (until March 4), James K. Polk (D-Tennessee) (starting March 4)
 Vice President: vacant (until March 4), George M. Dallas (D-Pennsylvania) (starting March 4)
 Chief Justice: Roger B. Taney (Maryland)
 Speaker of the House of Representatives: John Winston Jones (D-Virginia) (until March 4), John Wesley Davis (D-Indiana) (starting December 1)
 Congress: 28th (until March 4), 29th (starting March 4)

Events

January–March

 January 1 – The Cobble Hill Tunnel in Brooklyn is completed.
 January 29 – "The Raven" by Edgar Allan Poe is published for the first time (New York Evening Mirror).
 February 1 – Anson Jones, President of the Republic of Texas, signs the charter officially creating Baylor University, which becomes the oldest university in the State of Texas operating under its original name.
 February 28 – The United States Congress approves the annexation of Texas.
 March 1 – President John Tyler signs a bill authorizing the United States to annex the Republic of Texas.
 March 3
Florida is admitted as the 27th U.S. state (see History of Florida).
Postal reform act of Congress standardizes nationwide mail rates.
 March 4 
The United States Congress passes legislation overriding a presidential veto for the first time.
James K. Polk is sworn in as the 11th President of the United States, and George M. Dallas is sworn in as Vice President of the United States.

April–June
 April 10 – The Great Fire of Pittsburgh destroys much of the city of Pittsburgh, Pennsylvania.
 April 21 – Peoria, Illinois is incorporated a city.
 May – Frederick Douglass's Narrative of the Life of Frederick Douglass, an American Slave, written by himself, is published by the Boston Anti-Slavery Society.
 May 23 -The New York City Police Department is formed.

July–September
 July 4 – Near Concord, Massachusetts, Henry David Thoreau embarks on a 2-year experiment in simple living at Walden Pond (see Walden).
 July 19 – Great New York City Fire of 1845 breaks out in Lower Manhattan.
 July–August – In the United States Magazine and Democratic Review editor John L. O'Sullivan declares that foreign powers are trying to prevent American annexation of Texas in order to impede "the fulfillment of our manifest destiny to overspread the continent allotted by Providence for the free development of our yearly multiplying millions", the first use of the phrase "Manifest Destiny".
 August 28 – The journal Scientific American begins publication.

October–December

 October 10 – In Annapolis, Maryland, the Best School (later renamed the United States Naval Academy) opens with 50 midshipmen students and 7 professors.
 October 13 – A majority of voters in the Republic of Texas approve a proposed constitution, that if accepted by the United States Congress, will make Texas a U.S. state.
 October 21 – The New York Herald becomes the first newspaper to mention the game of baseball.
 October 22 – The New York Morning News becomes the first newspaper to include a box-score of a baseball game.
 December 2 – Manifest Destiny: U.S. President James K. Polk announces to Congress that the Monroe Doctrine should be strictly enforced and that the United States should aggressively expand into the West.
 December 5 – The Templars of Honor and Temperance is founded in the United States.
 December 6 – Alpha Sigma Phi fraternity is founded.
 December 27 
Anesthesia is used for childbirth for the first time (Dr. Crawford Long in Jefferson, Georgia).
American journalist John L. O'Sullivan claims in a newspaper article (in connection with the annexation of the Oregon Country) that the United States has a "Manifest Destiny" to expand its borders, the second time he uses the term; it will have a huge influence on the American imperialistic movement of the 19th century.
 December 29 – Texas is admitted as the 28th U.S. state (see History of Texas).

Unknown date
 Spaniards find Lost Dutchman Mine, Arizona.

Births
 January 19 – Anna Manning Comfort, American physician (died 1931)
 February 15 – Elihu Root, statesman and diplomat, recipient of the Nobel Peace Prize in 1912 (died 1937)
 March 4 – Henry Clay Taylor, admiral (died 1904)
 March 20 – Lucy Myers Wright Mitchell, scholar of classical sculpture (born in Persia, died 1888)
 March 22 – John Banister Tabb, poet (died 1909)
 April 21 – William Healey Dall, malacologist and explorer (died 1927)
 May 14 – Charles J. Train, admiral (died 1906)
 May 18 – John B. Allen, U.S. Senator from Washington from 1889 to 1893 (died 1903)
 June 13 – Effie Germon, actress and singer (died 1914)
 July 4 – Edmonia Lewis, African American sculptor (died 1907 in Europe)
 July 19 – Horatio Nelson Young, naval hero (died 1913)
 September 9 – Warner B. Bayley, admiral (died 1928)
 September 17 – Calvin S. Brice, U.S. Senator from Ohio from 1891 to 1897 (died 1898)
 October 13 – Charles Stockton, admiral (died 1924)
 October 17 – John J. Gardner, politician (died 1921)
 October 21 – Will Carleton, poet (died 1912)
 November 3 – Edward Douglass White, 9th Chief Justice of the United States from 1910 to 1921, Associate Justice of the U.S. Supreme Court from 1894 to 1910, and U.S. Senator from Louisiana from 1891 to 1894 (died 1921)
 November 9 – Elizabeth Reed, resident of Macon, Georgia, subject of The Allman Brothers Band song "In Memory of Elizabeth Reed" (died 1885)
 November 18 – Edwin Winter, railroad manager (died 1930)

Deaths
 March 16 – Isaac C. Bates, U.S. Senator from Massachusetts from 1841 to 1845 (born 1779)
 March 18 – Johnny Appleseed, nurseryman and pioneer (born 1774)
 April 10 – Thomas Sewall, anatomist (born 1786)
 September 10 – Joseph Story, Associate Justice of the U.S. Supreme Court Justice from 1811 to 1845 (born 1779)
 November 11 – Maria Gowen Brooks, poet (born c. 1794, died in Cuba)

See also
Timeline of United States history (1820–1859)

References

External links
 

 
1840s in the United States
United States
United States
Years of the 19th century in the United States